Lüchow-Dannenberg – Lüneburg is an electoral constituency (German: Wahlkreis) represented in the Bundestag. It elects one member via first-past-the-post voting. Under the current constituency numbering system, it is designated as constituency 37. It is located in northeastern Lower Saxony, comprising the Lüchow-Dannenberg and Lüneburg districts.

Lüchow-Dannenberg – Lüneburg was created for the inaugural 1949 federal election. Since 2009, it has been represented by Jakob Blankenburg of the Social Democratic Party (SPD).

Geography
Lüchow-Dannenberg – Lüneburg is located in northeastern Lower Saxony. As of the 2021 federal election, it comprises the entirety of the districts of Lüchow-Dannenberg and Lüneburg.

History
Lüchow-Dannenberg – Lüneburg was created in 1949, then known as Lüneburg – Dannenberg. In the 1965 through 1998 elections, it was named Lüneburg – Lüchow-Dannenberg. It acquired its current name in the 2002 election. In the inaugural Bundestag election, it was Lower Saxony constituency 13 in the numbering system. From 1953 through 1961, it was number 35. From 1965 through 1998, it was number 31. In the 2002 and 2005 elections, it was number 37. In the 2009 election, it was number 38. Since the 2013 election, it has been number 37.

Originally, the constituency comprised the independent city of Lüneburg and the districts of Landkreis Lüneburg and Lüchow-Dannenberg. In the 1953 election, it gained the Uelzen district with the exception of the city of Uelzen and the Samtgemeinden of Altes Amt Ebstorf and Suderburg. In the 1980 through 1998 elections, it comprised only the Lüchow-Dannenberg and Lüneburg districts. In the 2002 and 2005 elections, it also contained the Samtgemeinden of Elbmarsch, Hanstedt, and Salzhausen from Harburg district and the municipality of Munster from Soltau-Fallingbostel district. Since the 2009 election, it has comprised only the Lüchow-Dannenberg and Lüneburg districts.

Members
The constituency was first held by Friedrich Nowack of the Social Democratic Party (SPD), who served from 1949 until 1953. He was succeeded by Willi Koops of the Christian Democratic Union (CDU), who served a single term. He was succeeded by fellow CDU member Lambert Huys. In 1972, Horst Schröder of the CDU was elected representative. Klaus Harries served from 1987 to 1994, then Kurt-Dieter Grill from 1994 to 1998. The SPD won the constituency in 1998, and Arne Fuhrmann served a single term as representative. Hedi Wegener then served from 2002 to 2005. In 2009, Eckhard Pols of the CDU won the constituency. He was re-elected in 2013 and 2017. Jakob Blankenburg won the constituency for the SPD in 2021.

Election results

2021 election

2017 election

2013 election

2009 election

References

Federal electoral districts in Lower Saxony
1949 establishments in West Germany
Constituencies established in 1949